Giambattista Capretti (25 September 1946 – 26 September 2016) was an Italian boxer. He competed at the 1968 Summer Olympics and the 1972 Summer Olympics.

References

External links
 

1946 births
2016 deaths
Italian male boxers
Olympic boxers of Italy
Boxers at the 1968 Summer Olympics
Boxers at the 1972 Summer Olympics
Sportspeople from the Province of Brescia
Mediterranean Games gold medalists for Italy
Mediterranean Games medalists in boxing
Competitors at the 1971 Mediterranean Games
Light-welterweight boxers
20th-century Italian people